Oxycanus is a genus of moths of the family Hepialidae. There are 71 described species found in Australia and New Guinea.

Species
Oxycanus aedisima – Australia
Oxycanus aegrus – New Guinea
Oxycanus albostrigata – Australia
Oxycanus altenai – New Guinea
Oxycanus antipoda – Tasmania
Larva feeds on grasses
Oxycanus armatus – Australia
Oxycanus atrox – Australia
Oxycanus aurifex – Australia
Oxycanus australis – Australia
Oxycanus ballux – Australia
Oxycanus barnardi – Australia
Oxycanus beltista – Australia
Oxycanus buluwandji – Australia
Oxycanus byrsa – Australia
Oxycanus carus – Australia
Oxycanus determinata – Australia
Oxycanus diakonoffi – New Guinea
Oxycanus dirempta – Australia
Oxycanus discipennis – New Guinea
Oxycanus dives – New Guinea
Oxycanus eos – Australia
Oxycanus fuliginosa – Australia
Oxycanus gelidus – Australia
Oxycanus glauerti – Australia
Oxycanus goldfinchi – Australia
Oxycanus goodingi – Australia
Oxycanus hamatus – Australia
Oxycanus hebe – New Guinea
Oxycanus hecabe – New Guinea
Oxycanus herbuloti – New Guinea
Oxycanus herdus – Australia
Oxycanus hildae – Australia
Oxycanus incanus – Australia
Oxycanus janeus – Australia
Oxycanus kochi – Australia
Oxycanus loesus – Australia
Oxycanus lyelli – Australia
Oxycanus maculosus – Australia
Oxycanus mayri – New Guinea
Oxycanus meeki – New Guinea
Oxycanus naias – Australia
Oxycanus nigra – New Guinea
Oxycanus nigripuncta – New Guinea
Oxycanus niphadias – Australia
Oxycanus novaeguineensis – New Guinea
Oxycanus nuptialis – Australia
Oxycanus occidentalis – Australia
Oxycanus oreades – Australia
Oxycanus oressigenes – Australia
Oxycanus perditus – Australia
Oxycanus perplexus – New Guinea
Oxycanus poeticus – Australia
Oxycanus postflavida – New Guinea
Oxycanus postxois – New Guinea
Oxycanus promiscuus – Australia
Oxycanus rileyi – Australia
Oxycanus rosaceus – Australia
Oxycanus rufescens – Australia
Oxycanus salmonacea – Australia
Oxycanus serratus – New Guinea
Oxycanus sirpus – Australia
Oxycanus snelleni – New Guinea
Oxycanus spadix – Australia
Oxycanus sphragidias – Australia
Oxycanus stellans – Australia
Oxycanus subochracea – New Guinea
Oxycanus subvaria – Australia
Oxycanus sylvanus – Australia
Oxycanus tamsi – New Guinea
Oxycanus thasus – New Guinea
Oxycanus toxopeusi – New Guinea
Oxycanus tyres – New Guinea
Oxycanus xois – New Guinea
Oxycanus waterhousei – Australia

External links
Hepialidae genera

Hepialidae
Exoporia genera
Taxa named by Francis Walker (entomologist)